Club Hispano de Castrillón is a Spanish football club based in Piedras Blancas, Castrillón, Asturias. Founded in 1925, it plays it currently in Primera Regional, holding its home games at Estadio de Ferrota

History
Club Hispano de Castrillón was founded in 1925, but was dissolved years later and refounded in 1950.

Between 1986 and 1994, the club lived its golden era, qualifying several times for the promotion play-offs to Segunda División B and also for the Copa del Rey, where the club reached twice the third round.

In 2008 the club was relegated from Tercera División. This one would be the first of three consecutive relegations that left the club in the last tier of Asturian football.

With the club immersed in a serious financial trouble, it achieves its first promotion from the last stage in 2014.

Season to season

21 seasons in Tercera División

Women's team
Hispano created a women's team in 2011, that plays in the Regional league of Asturias.

It was retired at the end of the 2016–17 season.

Season to season

References

External links
Official website

Football clubs in Asturias
Association football clubs established in 1925
1925 establishments in Spain